Cadrieu is a commune in the Lot department in south-western France. It is around 25 km east of Cahors.

See also
Communes of the Lot department

References

Communes of Lot (department)